Caam refers to the heddles of a loom.

CAAM may refer to:

Organisations
 University of Puerto Rico at Mayagüez, originally the Colegio de Agricultura y Artes Mecánicas
 Centro Atlántico de Arte Moderno, in Gran Canaria, Spain, producer of the magazine Atlántica
 Civil Aviation Authority (Macau)
 Caam Tech Pvt Ltd (Pakistan)

United States
 California African American Museum
 Center for Asian American Media

Malaysia
 Civil Aviation Authority of Malaysia previously known as the Department of Civil Aviation Malaysia

Other uses
 Communauté d'agglomération Arles-Crau-Camargue-Montagnett, one of the Communes of the Bouches-du-Rhône department

See also
 Caribbean Accreditation Authority for Education in Medicine and other Health Professions (CAAM-HP)
 CAAMFest, a film festival